Yoon Jeung-hyun (born September 19, 1946) is a South Korean civil servant and politician, who served as acting Prime Minister of South Korea from August to October, 2010.

He was born in Masan, and graduated from Seoul National University. He became the Minister of Strategy and Finance on February 10, 2009.

External links
Biography

1946 births
Finance ministers of South Korea
Living people
Government ministers of South Korea
South Korean Roman Catholics
People from South Gyeongsang Province
Seoul National University School of Law alumni
South Korean civil servants
University of Wisconsin–Madison alumni
Papyeong Yun clan